The MacTier Cup is the name of the championship for the top senior men's rugby league in Canada.

Originally awarded to the champion of the Rugby Canada Super League (RCSL), the MacTier Cup was established in 1998 along with the RCSL. The first MacTier Cup Championship match was played between the Vancouver Island Crimson Tide and the Nova Scotia Keiths. Vancouver Island defeated Halifax in that game. The champions of the final RCSL championship were the Newfoundland Rock, who won the cup in 2008 after defeating the Calgary Mavericks 30–6.

Since 2009, the Cup has been awarded to the winners of the Canadian Rugby Championship (CRC). Since the inception of the CRC, the Ontario Blues have won the MacTier Cup six times, The BC Bears have won the Cup two times, while the Prairie Wolf Pack and the Atlantic Rock both have won the cup one time.

Champions

References

Recurring sporting events established in 1998
Rugby union trophies and awards
Rugby union competitions in Canada
Rugby Canada Super League
Canadian Rugby Championship
1998 establishments in Canada